8L or 8-L may refer to:

 An abbreviation for 8 litres
 Cargo Plus Aviation – IATA code
Typ 8L, a model of Audi A3
Kappa 8L, a model of Kappa (rocket)
F-8L, a model of Vought F-8 Crusader
Nova 8L, proposed model of Nova (rocket)
HJ-8L, a model of  HJ-8 missile
FR-8L, a relabel of the Roland Rhythm 77
Soyuz 8L, see Soyuz 7K-L1

See also
L8 (disambiguation)